Pandian Saraswathi Yadav Engineering College (PSYEC) was started in 2000 by entrepreneur and politician 'Hind Rattan' Malaysia S. Pandian. Pandian founded PSYEC with a vision to educate more rural students in the field of engineering and technology to pave the way for industrial prosperity and socioeconomic development in the country. The current principal, V. Dharmalingam, is in charge of the curriculum.

The campus is spread over 60+ acres in a serene environment, free from pollution. The college is approved by AICTE (All India Council for Technical Education), New Delhi and affiliated with Anna University.

History 
The College was established in September 2000, by "Hind Rattan" Malaysia S. Pandian.

The first class (184 students) graduated in 2004 with the affiliation of Madurai Kamaraj University. The second class (109 students) graduated in 2005 with affiliation of Anna University, Chennai.

Admission 
Admission criteria are published on the PSYEC website and details number of seats available for each degree.

References

External links 
 college website

Engineering colleges in Tamil Nadu
Colleges affiliated to Anna University
Education in Sivaganga district
Educational institutions established in 2000
2000 establishments in Tamil Nadu